Town Common is a coastal suburb of Townsville in the City of Townsville, Queensland, Australia.

It is locally known as "The Common".

Geography 
Town Common is bounded by the Bohle River to the west,  by the Coral Sea to the north-west and east, and Townsville Airport (Garbutt) to the south. The land in the suburb is mostly undeveloped with much of land contained within the Townsville Town Common Conservation Park. The western part of the suburb is a floodplain created by a mangrove-lined network of tributaries of the Bohle River.

Shelly Beach is at the northern coast of the suburb, but is not accessible by road.

The  developed land is in the south-east of the locality consists of a golf course, the Garden Settlement Aged Care Village on Cape Pallarenda Road, and a park.

The golf course is irrigated with treated waste water from the Mount St John Wastewater Treatment Plant in Mount St John.

History 
The wetlands and lowlands of Town Common the result of sand dune formation and water catchment drainage processes including erosion and sedimentation over thousands of years. Town Common was gazetted in 1869 as common land for the people of Townsville (established in 1864). In 1900 part of the wetlands was established as a sanitary reserve. In 1914 a pasturage reserve was established.

The median age of the residents was 81 years, reflecting that the only residential land in the suburb is an aged care village. 

In August 2016, Blue Care who operate the aged care village announced the opening of a new facility at Mount Louisa and their intention to transfer the aged care village residents to this new location.

Education 
There are no schools in Town Common. The nearest government primary school is Belgian Gardens State School in Belgian Gardens to the south-east. The nearest government secondary school is Townsville State High School in Railway Estate to the south-east.

Amenities 
Robertson Park is along the coast off Cape Pallarenda Drive

Rowes Bay Golf Club is in Emmerson Street.

References

Further reading

External links 

Suburbs of Townsville